Jeff Bean (born January 11, 1977) is a Canadian freestyle skier.

Bean competes in aerials, and made his World Cup debut in January 1996, and made his first World Cup podium later that season, finishing third in Kirchberg. One year later, Kirchberg was the site of his first two career World Cup wins, as he won events on back-to-back days.

Over his career, Bean placed on the podium at 17 World Cup events, and claimed 4 titles over a 10-year span. His most successful season came in 2003, when he placed 3rd overall in the World Cup standings. His lone medal at the World Championships came in 2005, when he finished second behind countryman Steve Omischl.

Bean competed in three Olympic games, beginning in 1998 and ending in 2006. His best finish was 4th in 2002, missing out on a medal by only two-tenths of a point. He also made the final in 1998, but finished 11th out of 12 competitors. In 2006, he was well positioned to make the final after the first jump, but a poor second jump left him in 19th place.

Additionally, Bean competed on the television show "Mantracker" in season 2, episode 8. He and fellow Olympian Steve Omishl, completed a gruelling 42 km route on foot in the Ontario wilderness over 2 days to beat the star of the show, Terry Grant, and sidekick Phil Lemieux to the finish line.

World Cup Podiums

References

External links
FIS profile

1977 births
Living people
Olympic freestyle skiers of Canada
Freestyle skiers at the 1998 Winter Olympics
Freestyle skiers at the 2002 Winter Olympics
Freestyle skiers at the 2006 Winter Olympics
Skiers from Ottawa
Canadian male freestyle skiers